The Haig Minibat is a high-wing, single-seat tailless motor glider that was designed by Larry Haig, and first flown in 1979.  At one time available as plans or in kit form for amateur construction. The kit is no longer available.

Design and development
The Minibat was designed by Haig as a motor glider, but without self-launching capabilities, instead the aircraft is launched by aerotow, winch launching or auto-tow. The small chainsaw engine provides enough power to ensure a positive rate of climb and prevent land-outs, but not enough power for launching. The design goal was a glider with slightly greater performance than the Schweizer 1-26.

The Minibat is constructed predominantly from foam and fiberglass and features a monowheel landing gear. The engine is mounted in the rear fuselage in pusher configuration, with the propeller mounted unconventionally between the fuselage and the rudder.

Operational history
In March 2011 there were ten Minibats registered with the Federal Aviation Administration in the USA.

Specifications (Minibat with wingtip extensions)

See also

References

External links
Three view drawing
Photo of Minibat

1970s United States sailplanes
Tailless aircraft
Homebuilt aircraft
Aircraft first flown in 1979
Motor gliders
Single-engined pusher aircraft